The Kyauk Ka Lat Pagoda is a Buddhist temple in the Kayin State, Myanmar. The temple complex is built onto prominent limestone rock formation surrounded by an artificial lake, and houses an active community of monks.

Description 
The complex at Kyauk Kalat contains a number of structures, shrines, and temples set on a limestone rock formation. The temple is located several miles away from the city of Hpa-An, and is in close proximity to a number of other Buddhist sites. The temple complex is a functional monastery, and is open for tours.  

During the 19th century, the temple's Pongyi (a Buddhist priest) was involved in a revolt against the British Empire in the aftermath of the Third Anglo-Burmese War. Thamanya Sayadaw—later known as a proponent of metta—was taught at the monastery in the 1920s.

References 

Buddhist pilgrimage sites in Myanmar
Pagodas in Myanmar
Historic sites in Myanmar
Tourist attractions in Myanmar